This page shows the results of the 1999 Women's Central American and Caribbean Basketball Championship, also known as the 1999 Centrobasket For Women, which was held in the city of Havana, Cuba from May 4 to May 9, 1999.

Competing nations

Preliminary round
Source:

Final round

5th place

3rd place

Final

Final ranking

References

External links
 FIBA Archives

Centrobasket Women
1998–99 in North American basketball
1999 in women's basketball
1999 in Cuban sport
International women's basketball competitions hosted by Cuba
1999 in Central American sport
1999 in Caribbean sport